Caballeros de Culiacán(Culiacán Knights) is a professional basketball club based in Culiacán, Sinaloa, Mexico. The team currently plays in the Circuito de Baloncesto de la Costa del Pacífico (CIBACOPA). In the past the team played in the Liga Nacional de Baloncesto Profesional (LNBP).

Notable players

Logos

References

Basketball teams established in 2001
2001 establishments in Mexico
Basketball teams in Mexico
Sports teams in Sinaloa
Sport in Culiacán